Leslie Balfour-Melville (9 March 1854 – 17 July 1937), born Leslie Balfour, was a Scottish amateur sportsman, serving as captain, opening batsman, and wicket-keeper for the Scotland national cricket team.

Balfour-Melville was also an international rugby union player, tennis player, ice skater, curler, long-jumper, and player of English billiards. He was a prolific golf medal winner, winning The Amateur Championship, at St Andrews in 1895. He also held several administrative positions within national governing bodies. He was President of the Scottish Rugby Union, President of the Scottish Cricket Union, and Captain of The Royal and Ancient Golf Club of St Andrews in 1906.

Balfour-Melville was an inaugural inductee into the Scottish Sports Hall of Fame in 2002.

Biography
Balfour was born in Bonnington, Edinburgh, on 9 March 1854 the son of James Balfour Melville (1815–1898) and his wife, Eliza Ogilvy Heriot Maitland (1821–1887).

He was educated at the Edinburgh Academy and the University of Edinburgh, he became a lawyer by profession, rising to be a Writer to the Signet. In 1893 the family changed its name to Balfour-Melville when his father succeeded to the estate of Mount Melville near St Andrews, Fife. His Edinburgh residence was at 53 Hanover Street in Edinburgh's New Town.

His son James also played cricket for Scotland before losing his life in the First World War.

Balfour-Melville died in North Berwick, East Lothian, on 16 July 1937. He is buried with his parents in the family tomb in the south-west corner of Greyfriars Kirkyard close to the Robertson mausoleum. On his grave he is named simply as Leslie Melville.

Cricket career

Playing for the Grange, he debuted against the Free Foresters in 1874. He played eighteen matches for the national side over 36 years. He captained Scotland in their first match against Ireland after the formation of the 2nd Scottish Cricket Union, and was the first president of the Scottish Cricket Union to play for the national side. During his career he scored 46 centuries. He served as president of the Scottish Cricket Union in 1909.

Golf career

Major championships

Amateur wins

Results timeline

Note: Balfour-Melville only played in the Open Championship and the Amateur Championship.

LA = Low amateur
NT = No tournament
WD = Withdrew
"T" indicates a tie for a place
R256, R128, R64, R32, R16,  = Round in which player lost in match play

Team appearances
England–Scotland Amateur Match (representing Scotland): 1902 (winners), 1903

Rugby union career

Amateur career

Leslie Balfour, as he was then, played for Edinburgh Academicals.

International career

He was capped once in 1872.

Referee career

He refereed the East v West district match in 1880.

Administrative career

Balfour-Melville became the 21st President of the Scottish Rugby Union. He served the 1893–94 term in office.

Tennis career

Balfour won the Scottish Lawn Tennis Championships in 1879.

Achievements
 Played rugby for Scotland against England, 1872
 Scottish Lawn Tennis Championship winner, 1879
 Captained Scotland to a cricketing victory over Australia, 1882
 The Amateur Championship winner, 1895; and runner-up in 1889; both at St Andrews Links
 Scottish billiards champion

See also
 List of Scottish cricket and rugby union players

References

Further reading

External links

 Player profile on scrum.com
 Wisden obituary
 Cricketarchive profile

1854 births
1937 deaths
19th-century male tennis players
19th-century Scottish people
Alumni of the University of Edinburgh
Amateur golfers
British male tennis players
Burials at Greyfriars Kirkyard
Cricketers from Edinburgh
Curlers from Edinburgh
Edinburgh Academicals rugby union players
Free Foresters cricketers
Golfers from Edinburgh
Grange cricketers
I Zingari cricketers
Marylebone Cricket Club cricketers
People educated at Edinburgh Academy
Presidents of the Scottish Rugby Union
Rugby union players from Edinburgh
Scotland international rugby union players
Scottish cricketers
Scottish Districts referees
Scottish lawyers
Scottish male curlers
Scottish male golfers
Scottish male long jumpers
Scottish male tennis players
Scottish players of English billiards
Scottish rugby union players
Scottish rugby union referees
Wicket-keepers
Scottish cricket administrators